Orchelimum concinnum, known generally as stripe-faced meadow katydid, is a species of meadow katydid in the family Tettigoniidae. Other common names include the red-faced meadow katydid and dusky-faced meadow katydid. It is found in North America and the Caribbean.

References

concinnum
Articles created by Qbugbot
Insects described in 1863